Girl in May is a 1956 novel by Scottish writer Bruce Marshall.

Plot summary
A romance set among a motley crowd of eccentrics of all ages who constitute the population of St. Andrews.

1956 British novels
Novels by Bruce Marshall
St Andrews
British romance novels
Constable & Co. books